Cheiracanthium mildei is a species of spider from the family Cheiracanthiidae. C. mildei is commonly known as the northern yellow sac spider, a name it partially shares with many other spiders of its genus.

Description 

C. mildei usually has a pale green or tan body, with darker brown palpi and chelicerae. An adult C. mildei is usually  in body size. Each leg ends in double claws, and the front pair is significantly longer (up to two times the size). The eyes have a tapetum lucidum that reflects back to the light source once lit, however the "canoe-shaped" tapetum they possess is incapable of forming sharp images, so the benefit of these tapetum is uncertain, although they may assist in navigation through the detection of the polarization of light from the sky. Although this spider can bite humans, the effects appear to be mild.

Habitat and distribution 
C. mildei is native to Europe and North Africa through to Central Asia. It is introduced to the United States and parts of South America. It widespread across the northeastern United States and eastern Canada, and can be found outside, or more commonly inside houses. It is thought to have been introduced into America from Europe by English colonists.

Prey and predators 
C. mildei is a dominant predator of S. littoralis (a moth species) in Africa and Mid Eastern regions. The mechanism of predation include causing direct death by consuming the larvae and causing indirect death by dispersing larvae from its host plants.

References 

Spiders of Europe
Spiders of North America
Spiders described in 1839
mildei